Jämtland County is a county or län in the middle of Sweden consisting of the provinces of Jämtland and Härjedalen, along with minor parts of Hälsingland and Ångermanland, plus two small uninhabited strips of Lapland and Dalarna. Jämtland County constitutes 12 percent of Sweden's total area,  and is the third largest county in the country. The county capital is Östersund and the county governor, appointed by the Swedish government, is Jöran Hägglund, who leads the administrative board. Jämtland County borders the counties of Dalarna, Gävleborg, Västernorrland, and Västerbotten. It also shares a border with the Norwegian county of Trøndelag.

The county was established in 1810 and its foundation has both domestic and foreign causes. Upon formation it only consisted of the provinces of Jämtland and Härjedalen, which is why the coat of arms is a shield parted per fess with their provincial arms.

Being sparsely populated, the land area of Jämtland County is larger than those of the Netherlands and Switzerland.

Province 

Jämtland County consists of primarily the provinces of Jämtland and Härjedalen, though minor parts of Hälsingland and Ångermanland are also included, along with small uninhabited areas in Lapland and Dalarna.

Administration 
The main aim of the County Administrative Board is to fulfil the goals set in national politics by the Riksdag and the Government, to coordinate the interests and promote the development of the county, to establish regional goals and safeguard the due process of law in the handling of each case. The County Administrative Board is a Government Agency headed by a Governor. See List of Jämtland Governors.

Demography 
Jämtland County is sparsely populated and more than one third of the population live on the countryside, making Jämtland County the second largest rural region in Sweden, after Gotland County, though a majority of the population live in the rather densely populated region surrounding lake Storsjön, commonly called Storsjöbygden, "the Storsjö district/countryside".

Politics 
The county is dominated by the Swedish Social Democratic Party and the Centre Party, which is unique in Sweden, but corresponds to the situation in the bordering Norwegian county of Nord-Trøndelag. The county is rather contrastive in the political field. While the municipality association and a majority of the municipalities are governed by liberal-conservative (lit. "bourgeois") majorities or by coalitions overstepping the bloc border, the county council is red-green and the Social Democrats receive three out of five mandates to the Riksdag.

After the Swedish county council election in 2018, the following political parties are represented in the Jämtland county council:

Riksdag elections 
The table details all Riksdag election results of Jämtland County since the unicameral era began in 1970. The blocs denote which party would support the Prime Minister or the lead opposition party towards the end of the elected parliament.

Governors

Municipalities 

In Härjedalen Province:
Härjedalen

In Jämtland Province:
Berg
Bräcke
Krokom
Ragunda
Strömsund
Åre
Östersund

Localities by population (2010)

Demographics

Foreign background 
SCB have collected statistics on backgrounds of residents since 2002. These tables consist of all who have two foreign-born parents or are born abroad themselves. The chart lists election years and the last year on record alone.

Heraldry 
The arms for the County of Jämtland is a combination of the arms of Jämtland and Härjedalen. When it is shown with a royal crown it represents the County Administrative Board. Blazon: "Parted per fess, the arms of Jämtland and the arms of Härjedalen."

References and notes

See also 
Duke of Jämtland, a title for members of the royal family (see Duchies in Sweden), born solely by Carl XVI Gustaf of Sweden before his accession to the throne.
Jamtlandic

External links 

Jämtland County Administrative Board
Jämtland County Council
Jämtlands Official Site
Hammarstrands camping

 

 
Counties of Sweden
County
Härjedalen
1810 establishments in Sweden
States and territories established in 1810